An advanced practice nurse (APN) is a nurse with post-graduate education and training in nursing.  Nurses practicing at this level may work in either a specialist or generalist capacity. APNs are prepared with advanced didactic and clinical education, knowledge, skills, and scope of practice in nursing.

The National Council of State Boards of Nursing along with other nursing authorities and organizations recommend the use of the term and acronym advanced practice registered nurse (APRN) as described in the Consensus Model for APRN Regulation, Licensure, Accreditation, Certification and Education.

Education, accreditation, and certification
APNs or APRNs are intended to demonstrate effective integration of theory, practice and experiences along with increasing degrees of autonomy in judgments and interventions, while remaining under physician supervision. Post-graduate education is designed to teach an APRN to use multiple approaches to decision-making, manage the care of individuals and groups, engage in collaborative practices with the patient or client to achieve best outcomes; provide a supportive environment for colleagues; manage the utilization of staff and physical resources; engage in ethically justifiable nursing practice; protect the rights of individuals and groups; engage in activities to improve nursing practice; develop therapeutic and caring relationships; fulfill the conduct requirements of the profession; act to enhance the professional development of self; and function in accordance with legislation and common law affecting nursing practice.

APRN education forms the basis of four recognized general areas of specialization:

 Clinical Nurse Specialist (CNS)
 Certified Registered Nurse Anesthetist (CRNA)
 Certified Nurse-Midwife (CNM)
 Certified Nurse Practitioner (CNP)

Each nurse specialty can have concentrations in a specific field or patient population.

In 2004, The American Association of Colleges of Nursing (AACN) in conjunction with the National Council of State Boards of Nursing (NCSBN) recommended that advanced practice registered nurses move the entry level degree to the doctorate level by 2015.  Accordingly, all APN training programs are recommended (but not required as of yet) to convert their master's degree to a Doctor of Nursing Practice (DNP) degree by the year 2015. Although the American Association of Nurse Anesthetists approved this recommendation, it is not requiring program compliance until the year 2025.

The majority of programs will grant a DNP degree. Because 45% of the nurse anesthesia programs are located in schools of allied health, these programs will award a Doctor of Nurse Anesthesia Practice (DNAP). The DNP will be the direct-entry, minimum academic requirement for advanced practice registered nurses; it is a clinical/practice-based doctorate but because it is not the entry degree for the profession of nursing (which includes advanced practice registered nursing), it is a terminal degree.

Regulation

Advance Practice Nursing in the United States
The preferred regulator term for advanced practice nursing in the United States is Advanced Practice Registered Nurse.Nursing in the United States is regulated at the state level. The National Council of State Boards of Nursing (NCSBN) drafts consensus models of proposed legislation for the individual states to implement. In 2008, the NCSBN's APRN consensus model identified four roles:
 certified registered nurse anesthetist
 certified nurse-midwive 
 clinical nurse specialist
 certified nurse practitioner

Patient outcomes
In 2020 Pain Medicine found that CNPs prescribe opioids at a rate 28 times higher than physician counterparts in states where they practice autonomously.

Terminal degrees 

An APRN may earn a terminal degree in several ways. A terminal degree is generally a doctorate.  In some fields, especially those linked to a profession (e.g., medicine, nursing, dentistry, law, optometry, architecture, pharmacy, social work, religious ministry, engineering, accounting, education, etc.), a distinction is to be drawn between a first professional degree, an advanced professional degree, and a terminal academic degree. A first professional degree is generally required by law or custom to practice the profession without limitation. An advanced professional degree provides further training in a specialized area of the profession. A first professional degree is an academic degree designed to prepare the holder for a particular career or profession, fields where scholarly research and academic activity are not the work, but rather the practice of a profession. In many cases, the first professional degree is also the terminal degree because usually no further advanced degree is required for practice in that field even though more advanced professional degrees may exist.

Examples of terminal degrees in research are:

 Doctor of Philosophy (Ph.D.)
 Doctor of Education (Ed.D.)
 Doctor of Science (D.Sc.)
 Doctor of Nursing Science (D.N.Sc., DNS)

Examples of terminal professional degrees in nursing are:

 Doctor of Nursing Practice (DNP)
 Doctor of Nurse Anesthesia Practice (DNAP)

Post-nominal initials
The specific titles, credentials and post-nominal initials used by advanced practice nurses will vary greatly by country, state and educational level.

A list of post-nominal initials include, but are not limited to:

 ACNP: Acute Care Nurse Practitioner
 AGACNP: Adult-Gerontology Acute Care Nurse Practitioner
 ANP: Adult Nurse Practitioner
 APHN: Advanced Public Health Nurse
 APRN: Advanced Practice Registered Nurse (Refers to the four recognized general areas of advanced professional specialization: CRNA, NP, CNM, and CNS)
 APN: Advanced Practice Nurse (same as Advanced Practice Registered Nurse but not recommended as a legally recognized title)
 ARNP: Advanced Registered Nurse Practitioner (refers to Nurse Practitioners in some states in the US)
 C or BC following a title: Certified or Board Certified (i.e., APRN-BC, WHNP-BC, PNP-BC, FNP-C, GNP-C, ANP-BC)
 CMCN: Certified Managed Care Nurse 
 CNM: Certified Nurse Midwife
 CNS: Clinical Nurse Specialist
 CRNP: Certified Registered Nurse Practitioner
 CS: Clinical Specialist
 CRNA: Certified Registered Nurse Anesthetist
 DNP: Doctor of Nursing Practice (the terminal professional degree for APNs)
 FNP: Family Nurse Practitioner
 GNP: Gerontological Nurse Practitioner
 NNP: Neonatal Nurse Practitioner
 NP: Nurse Practitioner
 ONP: Oncology Nurse Practitioner
 PMHCNS: Psychiatric & Mental Health Clinical Nurse Specialist
 PMHNP: Psychiatric & Mental Health Nurse Practitioner
 PNP: Pediatric Nurse Practitioner
 PNP-AC: Pediatric Nurse Practitioner- Acute Care
 PsyNP: Psychiatric Nurse Practitioner
 WHNP: Women's Health Nurse Practitioner

See also
 Nurse practitioner

References

External links
 Germany Network of Advanced Practice Nurses
 Coalition of Advanced Practice Nurses of Indiana
 Canadian Association of Advanced Practice Nurses
 Information about Advanced Practise Nurses by the Singapore Nursing Board

Nursing specialties